James Stopford may refer to:

James Stopford, 1st Earl of Courtown (1700–1770), Irish politician
James Stopford, 2nd Earl of Courtown (1731–1810), known as Viscount Stopford 1762–1770; Anglo-Irish peer and Tory politician
James Stopford, 3rd Earl of Courtown (1765–1835), Anglo-Irish peer and Tory politician
James Stopford, 4th Earl of Courtown (1794–1858)
James Stopford, 9th Earl of Courtown
James Stopford (bishop) (died 1759), Bishop of Cloyne
James Stopford (Australian politician) (1878–1936), member of the Queensland Legislative Assembly

See also
Stopford (surname)
Earl of Courtown